Uroleucon sonchi is a species of aphid in the family Aphididae. It is found in Europe and Australia.

Subspecies
These three subspecies belong to the species Uroleucon sonchi:
 Uroleucon sonchi afghanicum (Narzikulov & Umarov, 1972)
 Uroleucon sonchi sonchi (Linnaeus, 1767)
 Uroleucon sonchi stepposa

References

External links

 

Articles created by Qbugbot
Insects described in 1767
Taxa named by Carl Linnaeus
Macrosiphini